Zhang Ailing (born 1957) is a retired badminton player from China.

Career
In 1978 Zhang won women's singles at the rival "world championship" which was run by the short-lived World Badminton Federation prior to China's entry into the International Badminton Federation (now Badminton World Federation). She was the dominant international singles player when China joined the IBF in 1981, winning the multi-sport World Games in 1981, the Asian Games in 1982, and the prestigious All-England Championships in both 1982 and 1983, as well as a host of other significant titles. In the 1983 IBF World Championships, however, she was beaten in the semifinal by Chinese teammate Han Aiping and after this result was unable to regain her previous dominance. Zhang played third singles on China's 1984 Uber Cup (women's international) team which won the team world championship.  

Whether because Zhang, by then in her late twenties, could no longer beat her teammates Han and Li Lingwei, or because of her marriage to fellow Chinese player Chen Changjie, she disappeared from international badminton after the 1983-1984 season.

Achievements

World Championships

World Cup

World Games

Asian Games

International tournaments 
The World Badminton Grand Prix sanctioned by International Badminton Federation (IBF) from 1983 to 2006.

 IBF Grand Prix tournament

Invitational tournament

References

1957 births
Living people
Chinese female badminton players
Asian Games medalists in badminton
Badminton players at the 1978 Asian Games
Asian Games gold medalists for China
Badminton players at the 1982 Asian Games
Medalists at the 1978 Asian Games
Medalists at the 1982 Asian Games
World Games medalists in badminton
World Games gold medalists
Competitors at the 1981 World Games
Badminton players from Jiangsu
Badminton players from Shanghai